Coin is an unincorporated community in  Pulaski County, Kentucky, United States. The Coin Post Office closed in December 1934.

References

Unincorporated communities in Pulaski County, Kentucky
Unincorporated communities in Kentucky